John Belfield (21 December 1669 – 1751), of Primley Hill, Paignton, and Exeter, Devon, was a British lawyer and Tory politician who sat in the House of Commons from 1728 to 1734.

Belfield was the second son of Allen Belfield, barrister of Lower Knoll, Rattery, near  Totnes, Devon,  and his wife  Mary Savory. He matriculated at Oriel College, Oxford in 1688. He was admitted at Inner Temple and was called to the bar in May 1695. He married. Jaquetta Finney, daughter  of Samuel Finney, rector of Exbourne, and acquired Primley Hill on the marriage.

Belfield was appointed deputy recorder of Totnes in 1700. He became a freeman of Exeter in 1711 and was appointed serjeant at law 1716. He was returned   as a Tory Member of Parliament for Exeter at a by-election on 25 May 1728 and voted consistently against the Government. He was elected recorder of Exeter  on 21 September 1728.  At the  1734 British general election, he lost his seat  and did not stand again. As recorder of Exeter, he signed a loyal address during the rebellion in 1745.

Belfield  was overturned in his coach on 19 October 1751 and died  from his injuries the following day. He left a son, Finney, and two daughters.

References

1669 births
1751 deaths
Members of the Parliament of Great Britain for Exeter
British MPs 1727–1734
British MPs 1734–1741
British MPs 1741–1747
British MPs 1747–1754